Feel Special is the eighth extended play by South Korean girl group Twice. It was released by JYP Entertainment on September 23, 2019. Marketed as the group's eighth "mini album" release, it consists of seven tracks, including the lead single of the same name and the Korean version of their Japanese single "Breakthrough".

The EP featuring genres from EDM, hip hop and '90s music, all members of Twice participated in the album as songwriters. Music critics complimented the album production, with the EP being a commercial success for the group recording sales of over 500,000 copies. It was Twice's best-selling album until the release of their succeeding EP, More & More.

Background 
Following the release of Fancy You in April, and the ongoing success of Twice's "Twicelights" world tour, JYP Entertainment first revealed details about the group's upcoming album titled Feel Special with the title track of the same name on September 9, 2019, with its release slated for September 23 at 6PM KST. A teaser clip starring Nayeon was first unveiled on the same day. The following day, a teaser clip starring Jeongyeon was revealed. The tracklist for their upcoming album was also posted, revealing the credits for the title track "Feel Special" and for the Korean version of Twice's Japanese single "Breakthrough". On September 11, the group posted a teaser clip starring Momo, alongside individual teaser images for Nayeon, Jeongyeon, and Momo. When Momo's teaser clip was revealed, she went viral on Twitter due to her change of hairstyle, with her name ranking higher on the US Twitter real-time trending list beating #AppleEvent, leading to American businessman Jack Phan raising the question, "What is Momo?". On September 12, a teaser clip featuring Sana was released.

Following the release of Sana's teaser clip, the group shared full details for their comeback's track list, revealing that Nayeon wrote lyrics for "Rainbow," Jihyo participated in "Get Loud," Dahyun helped write lyrics for "Trick It," Momo having penned "Love Foolish," with all group members being credited for the lyrics of "21:29." On September 13, a teaser video starring Jihyo was uploaded, followed by a teaser video starring Mina which was uploaded on the following day. On September 14, teaser images for Sana, Jihyo, and Mina were posted. On September 15, a teaser clip featuring Dahyun was uploaded and on the following day, an individual teaser clip starring Chaeyoung was released. Tzuyu's individual teaser video was revealed on September 17. On the same day, individual teaser images for Dahyun, Chaeyoung, and Tzuyu were uploaded.

Teaser photos featuring all members of the group were unveiled on September 18. The first music video teaser was uploaded by the group on the following day, alongside another set of group teaser photos. On September 21, a highlight medley for the album was released by the group. On September 22, Twice unveiled the online cover for "Feel Special".

On September 23, Twice released the final music video teaser for the album's eponymous title track. The EP was officially released on the same day, with the group holding a press conference at the Yes24 Live Hall in Gwangjang-dong, Seoul.

Composition 
Feel Special is an extended play consisting of seven tracks featuring genres from EDM, hip hop and 90s music. All members of Twice participated in the album production as songwriters. The eponymous title track is described as a party-pop song featuring the usage of synth music, written and composed by J. Y. Park, who stated that he based the lyrics from a conversation that he had with the members of Twice. "Rainbow" features a British garage beat, and is penned by Nayeon. The song lyrically talks about self-confidence and self-discovery. "Get Loud", written by member Jihyo, is classified as a dance song and further described as a "girl power anthem". "Trick It" features a "sweet, delicate" melody coupled with a disco beat, written by member Dahyun with the song depicting on how one tells white lies for the happiness of a certain person. "Love Foolish" is a track with EDM and synth-pop influences, penned by Momo. "21:29" is described as an amalgamation of retro soul, lounge, R’n’B and 90s hip hop, with all members being credited for the track's lyrics. The song was stated to be dedicated for the group's fanbase. The closing track, "Breakthrough", is Korean version of the group's fifth Japanese single from their album, &Twice, that heavily features brass music.

Promotion 
On the day of the album's release, JYP Entertainment released an official statement revealing that while member Mina participated in the production for Feel Special as well as the filming for their music video, she will be continuing her health-related hiatus due to anxiety concerns and thus will not be able to participate in the promotional activities for the EP. Additionally, when the group held their first promotional showcase for Feel Special at the Yes24 Live Hall in Gwangjang-dong, Jihyo performed without doing the choreography, with JYP Entertainment stating that she was receiving medical treatment for a minor neck injury.

Twice appeared on JTBC television program Idol Room on September 24, 2019. They began their music show promotions for Feel Special starting with a performance on M Countdown on September 26. They also performed on KBS2' Music Bank, MBC's Music Core, and SBS' Inkigayo, among others. On September 27, the group performed at the MBN Hero Concert 2019 held at the Jamsil Indoor Gymnasium in Seoul. Members Nayeon, Jihyo, and Chaeyoung appeared as guests on the tvN television program Amazing Saturday-DoReMi Market on September 28.

Critical reception 
Writing for Sound Digest, Amanda Lee noted that Feel Special is an "exceptional comeback" following Twice's increased international presence after the release of Fancy You, stating that the tracks from the group's latest album "[is a] pop perfection and showcases the girls’ increasing presence in crafting timely songs that are relatable and catchy." Tamar Herman of Billboard magazine praised the group's creative control over the EP, and describing the material as "an unrelenting show of pop perfection from the girl group". Billboard also included Feel Special in its "25 Best K-pop Albums of 2019: Critics' Picks" list ranking at number 14, citing the group's distinctive pop production seen in "Feel Special" and "Rainbow", as well as their venture into maturity with "Love Foolish" and "21:29". Chris Gillet from South China Morning Post Youngpost complimented the variety of music genres present in the album and how the group was able to mix genres "in a way most other acts cannot".

Jeff Benjamin of the South China Morning Post included the album's eponymous title track in his "10 Best K-pop songs of 2019", ranking at number three and describing the song as a "stunning, synth-driven single that not only continued Twice’s string of pristine chart-toppers, but also had a deeper message about taking care of yourself." Crystal Bell from MTV News included the B-side "Love Foolish" in her "Best K-pop B-sides of 2019" list, ranking the song at number 1 and calling it proof that "Twice are capable of so much more than cheery hooks." Bell first stated that every B-side from Feel Special was deserving of a spot on the list. Buzzfeed included the B-side "Trick It" in their "20 Best K-pop B-sides of 2019" list, ranking at number 12, stating that the track "still goes strong on even the 210th listen." Cho Eun-jae of Idology Korea ranked Feel Special at number four in the website's "2019: Album of the Year" list, stating that the album is "full of more wild and charismatic sound than ever, with a danceable mood that is the traditional virtue of JYP." They then stated that Twice's album quality is increasing throughout the development of their career.

In a mixed review, Kim Do-heon of IZM gave the album a rating of 2.5 over 5 points, praising the production work of J.Y.Park, but stated that Feel Special is "not a sufficient basis for the transition to [more] mature and refined concepts."

Commercial performance 
Upon the release of Feel Special, Twice broke their own first-week album sales record when they achieved sales of 154,000 copies on Hanteo on September 29, 2019. Their previous EP release, Fancy You, initially held the record for highest first-week sales volume for a Korean girl group with 151,000 copies sold. The EP debuted atop the weekly Gaon Album Chart. The album also charted on both the Japan Digital Albums chart and the Oricon Albums Chart, debuting at numbers 2 and 3 respectively. The album was then certified Platinum by Gaon upon reaching 250,000 copies sold. Feel Special ranked second on the Monthly Gaon Album Chart for the month of September, recording sales of 368,842 copies. On October 29, Gaon confirmed that Feel Special had reached 400,000 copies sold in shipments, becoming Twice's best-selling album until it was surpassed by their succeeding EP release, More & More, in 2020. The album received a 2× Platinum certification from the Korea Music Content Association on March 10, 2022.

Track listing 

Notes

Charts

Weekly charts

Year-end charts

Certifications

Accolades

Release history

See also 
 List of certified albums in South Korea
 List of Gaon Album Chart number ones of 2019

References 

2019 EPs
Korean-language EPs
Twice (group) EPs
JYP Entertainment EPs